Chanie "Charlie" Wenjack (January 19, 1954October 23, 1966) was an Ojibwe (Anishinaabe) First Nations boy who ran away from Cecilia Jeffrey Indian Residential School, where he boarded for three years in Kenora, Ontario, Canada. He died of hunger and exposure at Farlane, Ontario, while trying to walk 600 km (370 mi) back to his home, Ogoki Post on the Marten Falls Reserve.

His ordeal and his death brought attention to the treatment of children in the Canadian Indian residential school system: following Wenjack's death, an inquest into the matter was ordered by the Government of Canada.

Early life, education and escape

Chanie Wenjack was born on January 19, 1954, at Ogoki Post on the Marten Falls Reserve. In 1963, when he was nine, Wenjack and three of his sisters were sent to Cecilia Jeffrey Indian Residential School in Kenora. The school, which housed approximately 150 students at the time, was funded by the Canadian government and overseen by the Women’s Missionary Society of the Presbyterian Church. Wenjack spent the first two years of his schooling in grade one and was put in remedial classes soon after. He was known to have a good sense of humour, according to the school principal, and was often the first to recognize wordplay. 

The three boys stayed with Ralph and Jackie's uncle, Charley Kelly, in Redditt. He had found a CN passenger timetable which included a map and was using it as guide to get back home. The Kellys gave him some food and matches and suggested that he ask for help from the section maintenance crews stationed along the line.

Death

Bruises indicated that he fell several times. He collapsed and died sometime on the morning of October 23 in a rock cut near Farlane.

His body was discovered beside the track at 11:20 am on October 23 by Elwood McIvor, a CN railway engineer on freight train number No. 821. Elwood contacted the Ontario Provincial Police (OPP) who recovered the body an hour later with help from a CN section crew. Coroner Dr. Glenn Davidson determined the cause of the death was attributed to exposure and hunger.

On October 27, 1966, Wenjack was buried at the cemetery on the reserve beside the Albany River.

Inquest and aftermath

On November 17 an inquest was begun and a report was commissioned and determined that:

Ethical questions were raised and it brought to light the abuse and treatment of Indigenous children in the residential school system. A year after Wenjack's death, an article written by journalist Ian Adams, "The Lonely Death of Charlie Wenjack," was published in February 1967 in Maclean's magazine. The article brought the ordeal to national attention.

The Wenjack affair along with many other incidents would bring legislative reforms and class action lawsuits as well as the Indian Residential Schools Settlement Agreement and the Truth and Reconciliation Commission.

Impact

Today the story of Wenjack has been seen as a symbol of resistance against the residential school system. In 1973, Indigenous students at Trent University lobbied for a building to be named after Wenjack. The largest lecture hall on campus was subsequently named Wenjack Theatre in Wenjack's honour. On March 9, 2018, Trent University marked the official launch of the Chanie Wenjack School for Indigenous Studies.

In 2016, the Gord Downie-Chanie Wenjack Fund was established to help with reconciliation between Canada and Indigenous peoples.

Popular culture
On June 21, 2016, a Heritage Minute about Wenjack's death was released by Historica Canada to coincide with National Aboriginal Day. Unlike other Heritage Minutes that were narrated by actors, Wenjack's was narrated by his sister, Pearl. 

The Tragically Hip singer Gord Downie wrote a concept album based on Wenjack's escape. The album, Secret Path, was released on October 18, 2016, along with a concurrent graphic novel of Wenjack's story by novelist Jeff Lemire and an animated film which aired on CBC Television.

Published in October 2016, a novella by Canadian author Joseph Boyden focused on the suffering Wenjack endured and his state of mind during his ordeal. Its title is simply Wenjack. The novella was released alongside Snip, an animated short film by Terril Calder.

"Charlie", a song recorded in 1971 by singer-songwriter Willie Dunn about Wenjack, was not well-known at the time, but received renewed attention in the early 2020s following the release of both Secret Path and the Dunn compilation album Creation Never Sleeps, Creation Never Dies.

References

External links
 Heritage Minutes: Chanie Wenjack
 The Gord Downie and Chanie Wenjack Fund

1954 births
1966 deaths
Indigenous child displacement in Canada
Deaths by starvation
Deaths from hypothermia
Ojibwe people
People from Kenora District
20th-century First Nations people
Canadian children
Burials in Ontario
First Nations history in Ontario
Child deaths